ROXs 12 is a binary system of pre-main-sequence stars. It belongs to the Rho Ophiuchi cloud complex. The surface temperature of the primary star is 3900 K. ROXs 12 is much younger than the  Sun with an age of 7.6 million years.

A multiplicity survey detected a stellar companion to ROXs 12 in 2017, named 2MASS J16262774–2527247, at a projected separation of 5100 AU.

Planetary system
In 2005, one planet was discovered on a wide orbit by direct imaging, was confirmed in 2013 and named ROXs 12 b. The planet's measured temperature is 3100 K.

The primary star is surrounded by a protoplanetary disk, although it is not very massive, being less than 4 . The secondary star also has a protoplanetary disk, and it is much more massive, equal to 10-1.07. The disk is inclined to the equatorial plane of the star.

References

Scorpius (constellation)

Pre-main-sequence stars
Planetary systems with one confirmed planet
J16262803-2526477
Circumstellar disks
Binary stars